Edel Oliva (born February 12, 1965) is a retired male race walker from Cuba. He set his personal best in the men's 50 km event (3:52:19) on March 24, 1995 during the 1995 Pan American Games in Mar del Plata, Argentina. He was a bronze medallist at the competition and also won a gold medal at the 1993 Central American and Caribbean Games.

International competitions

References

External links
 

1965 births
Living people
Cuban male racewalkers
Pan American Games medalists in athletics (track and field)
Pan American Games bronze medalists for Cuba
Athletes (track and field) at the 1991 Pan American Games
Athletes (track and field) at the 1995 Pan American Games
Central American and Caribbean Games gold medalists for Cuba
Competitors at the 1990 Central American and Caribbean Games
Competitors at the 1993 Central American and Caribbean Games
Central American and Caribbean Games medalists in athletics
Medalists at the 1991 Pan American Games